The year 690 BC was a year of the pre-Julian Roman calendar. In the Roman Empire, it was known as year 64 Ab urbe condita . The denomination 690 BC for this year has been used since the early medieval period, when the Anno Domini calendar era became the prevalent method in Europe for naming years.

Events

By place

China 
 Duke Xiang of Qi,  Duke Xuan of Chen, Zheng-zi Ying met at Chui(垂).
Marquis of Ji(紀) didn't surrender to Qi, and passed the throne to his younger brother, Ji Ji(紀季).

Births

Deaths 

 King Wu of Chu
Xuan Jiang, Chinese Duchess.

References